Typophyllum spurioculis is a species of leaf-mimicking katydids belonging to the genus Typophyllum.

References

Insects described in 2017
Pterochrozinae